SH-I-048A (SH-i-048A) is a benzodiazepine derivative related in structure to compounds such as flubromazepam and meclonazepam. SH-I-048A is described as a non subtype selective superagonist at the benzodiazepine site of GABAA receptors, with a binding affinity of 0.77nM at the α1 subtype, 0.17nM at α2, 0.38nM at α3 and 0.11nM at α5. It has been used to study the functional differences between the different subtypes of the GABAA receptor.

See also 
 GL-II-73
 QH-II-66
 SH-053-R-CH3-2'F

References 

Benzodiazepines
GABAA receptor positive allosteric modulators